Albania
  Bledar Kola
  Ilir Kastrati
  Maldin Ymeraj
  Igli Doko
  Kristo Shehu
  Adriano Skenderaj
  Aleksandro Sadikaj
  Orgesi Sulce
  Ergys Kaçe
  Alexandros Robi
  Leandro Frroku
  Enis Çokaj
  Alexandros Tereziou
  Georgi Tsitsi
  Ergin Büçi
  Mateo Rüsit
  Pavlo Dyrmishi
  Giannis Thomas
  Klidman Lilo
  Ervin Töre
  Elton Fikaj
  Andrea Hasanogo
  Orgest Olmenaj
  Angelo Latifaj
  Rusit Xheka
  Adriano Bregu
  Loukas Tsatali 
Algeria
  Mehdi Abeid
  Walid Abeid
Angola
  Manucho
Argentina
  Óscar Álvarez
  Roberto Gramajo
  Marcelino Britapaja
  Roque Alfaro
  Raúl Valian
  Juan Ramón Verón
  Roberto Agueropolis
  Luis Andreuchi
   Juan José Borrelli
  Juan Ramón Rocha
  Fernando Galetto
  Ezequiel González
  Víctor David López
   Sebastián Ariel Romero
  Sebastián Leto
  Iván Díaz
  Luciano Figueroa
  Lucas Villafáñez
  Lautaro Rinaldi
  Andrés Chávez
  Emanuel Insúa
  Facundo Sánchez
  Sebastián Palacios
  Tiago Romano
  Daniel Mancini
  Valentin Mancini 
Armenia
  Zares Minasyan
  Vardan Adzemian
  Davit Gizgizyan
  Rafik Mishakyan
  Arsenis Kapamatzian
  Garabet Takesian
Australia
  Jason Polak
  Ioannis Samaras
  Chris Kalantzis
  Andrew Vlahos
  Lou Christodoulou
  George Stamoulis
  Robert Stambolziev
  Panos Armenakas
  Konstantinos Dellas-Grivas
Austria
  Willy Fitz 
  Helmut Kirisits
  Andreas Ivanschitz
Belgium
  Stergos Marinos
  Viktor Klonaridis                         
Bosnia and Herzegovina
  Fikret Mujkić
  Zlatan Nalić                                                                                                    
Brazil
  Araquem de Melo
  Antonio Benitez Gómez
  Eliomar Carvalho
  Júlio César
  Mauro
  Anderson de Lima
  Flávio Conceição
  Ricardo Bóvio
  Jheimy
  Cleyton
  Marcelo Mattos
  Rodrigo
  Gabriel
  Gilberto Silva
  David
  Yuri Mamute
  Lucas Evangelista
  Rodrigo Moledo
  Luciano
  Maurício
  Mateus Vital
  Jonas Toró
  Bernard
  Gustavo Furtado 
Bulgaria
  Hristo Kolev
  Tomas Lafchis
  Vladimir Gadzhev
  Ivan Ivanov
Cameroon
   Joël Epalle
   Pierre Ebéde
   Fabrice Fokobo
  Olivier Boumal
Canada
  Ilias Iliadis
Chile
  Julio Crisosto
Colombia
  Victor Ibarbo
  Juan José Perea
 Congo
  Christopher Samba
Croatia
  Velimir Zajec
  Aljoša Asanović
  Robert Jarni
  Goran Vlaović
  Mario Galinović
  Silvio Marić
  Daniel Šarić
  Anthony Šerić
  Igor Bišćan
  Srđan Andrić
  Ante Rukavina
  Gordon Schildenfeld
  Danijel Pranjić
  Mladen Petrić
  Fran Tudor
  Zvonimir Šarlija
Cyprus
  Diomidis Symeonidis
  Panagiotis Sialos
  Panikos Iakovou
  Demetris Kizas
  Andreas Christodoulou
  Demetris Ekonomou
  Kostas Malekkos
  Michalis Konstantinou
  Constantinos Charalambides
  Michalis Shimitras
  Christos Ierides
  Rafail Michael
  Daniil Paroutis
  Michalis Christodoulou
  Evagoras Antoniou
  Nikolas Dimitriou
Czech Republic
  Rudolf Skácel
  Loukas Vyntra
  Angelos Vyntra
Denmark
  René Henriksen
   Jan Michaelsen
  Claus Nielsen
  Kim Elgaard
  Rasmus Thelander
  Uffe Bech
 DR Congo
  Lando Fusu
  Paul-José M'Poku
  Yeni Ngbakoto
  Coque
Ecuador
  Bryan Cabezas
Egypt
 Ahmed Hamdi
 Bilal Mazhar
England
  John Cyril Campbell
  David Barnes
  Grigoris Kokolakis
  Alexandros Mouzakitis
  Luke Steele
  Michael-Peter Numan
Finland
  Joonas Kolkka
  Robin Lod
France
  Dion
  Dembla
  Daniel Foux
  Alain Raguel
  Djibril Cissé
  Sidney Govou
  Damien Plessis
  Jean-Alain Boumsong
  Mathias Dimizas
  Anthony Mounier
  Yohan Mollo
  Alexis Trouillet
Germany
  Walter Wagner
  Marco Villa
  Karlheinz Pflipsen
  Markus Münch
  Konstantinos Ipirotis
  Alexandros Pagalis
  Alexandros Konstantinidis
  Giorgos Machlelis
  Jens Wemmer
  Odisseas Vlachodimos
  Panagiotis Vlachodimos
  Giannis Tsingos
  Yohan Remoundos
  Dimitris Kontogeorgis
Ghana
  Derek Boateng
  Kwame Pele Frimpong
  Quincy Owusu Abeyie
  Michael Essien
  Mubarak Wakaso

Greece
  Christos Albanis
  Alexis Alexoudis
  Sotiris Alexandropoulos
  Georgios Alexopoulos
  Alexandros Anagnostopoulos
  Angelos Anastasiadis
  Vangelis Anastasopoulos
  Kyriakos Andreopoulos
  Vlasis Andrikopoulos
  Sotiris Angelopoulos
  Vasilios Angelopoulos
  Antonis Antoniadis
  Kostas Antoniou
  Kostas Apostolakis
  Stratos Apostolakis
  Konstantinos Apostolopoulos
  Achilleas Aslanidis
  Andreas Athanasakopoulos
  Tasos Avlonitis
  Angelos Basinas
  Christos Bourbos
  Giannis Bouzoukis
  Dimosthenis Chantzaras
  Lazaros Christodoulopoulos
  Tasos Chatzigiovanis
  Ilias Chatzitheodoridis
  Grigoris Charalampidis
  Diamantis Chouchoumis
  Nikos Christogeorgos
  Georgios Delikaris
  Mitsos Dimitriou
  Christos Dimopoulos
  Thanasis Dimopoulos
  Elini Dimoutsos
  Thanasis Dimitroulas
  Thanasis Dinas
  Sokratis Dioudis
  Mimis Domazos
  Anastasios Donis
  Christos Donis
  Giorgos Donis
  Kostas Eleftherakis
  Dimitris Emmanouilidis
  Stefanos Evangelou
  Xenofon Fetsis
  Panagiotis Filakouris
  Takis Fyssas
  Kostas Frantzeskos
  Mike Galakos
  Theofanis Gekas
  Paris Georgakopoulos
  Lysandros Georgamlis
  Giorgos Georgiadis
  Fotis Georgiou
  Michalis Gerothodoros
  Nikos Giannakopoulos
  Nikos Giannitsanis
  Xenofon Gittas
  Giannis Goumas
  Charis Grammos
  Vangelis Ikonomou
  Takis Ikonomopoulos
  Georgios Ioannidis
  Fotis Ioannidis
  George Kalafatis
  Ioannis Kalitzakis
  Dimitrios Kalligeris
  Nikos Kaltsas
  Aristidis Kamaras
  Argyris Kampetsis
  Anthimos Kapsis
  Stefanos Kapino
  Tilemachos Karabas
  Nikos Karageorgiou
  Dimitris Karagiannis
  Georgios Karagounis
  Nikolaos Karelis
  Nikos Karoulias
  Pavlos Karvounis
  Kostas Katsouranis
  Dimosthenis Kavouras
  Kostas Kiassos
  Thanasis Kolitsidakis
  Dimitris Kolovetsios
  Dimitris Kolovos
  Kostas Konstantinidis
  Pantelis Konstantinidis
  Vasilis Konstantinou
  Konstantinos Kotsaris
  Giannis Kotsiras
  Stefanos Kotsolis
  Christos Kountouriotis
  Nikos Kourbanas
  Dimitris Kourbelis
  Alexis Koutsias
  Nikos Kourkoulos
  Nikos Kousidis
  Giorgos Koutroubis
  Tasos Kritikos
  Stelios Kritikos
  Christos Kryparakos
  Ioannis Kyrastas
  Sotirios Kyrgiakos
  Tasos Lagos
  Lazaros Lamprou
  Sotiris Leontiou
  Kostas Linoxilakis
  Spiros Livathinos
  Takis Loukanidis
  Nikos Lyberopoulos
  Vangelis Mantzios
  Spiros Marangos
  Nikos Marinakis
  Dimitris Markos
  Apostolos Martinis
  Charis Mavrias
  Fanis Mavrommatis
  Pavlos Mavroudis
  Christos Melissis
  Theodoros Mingos
  Antonis Minou
  Tasos Mitropoulos
  Victor Mitropoulos
  Antonis Miyiakis
  Georgios Nasiopoulos
  Apostolos Nikolaidis
  Theofilaktos Nikolaidis
  Antonis Nikopolidis
  Sotiris Ninis
  Nikos Nioplias
  Marinos Ouzounidis
  Loukas Panourgias
  Nikos Pantidos
  Epaminondas Pantelakis
  Lakis Petropoulos 
  Antonis Petropoulos
  Achilleas Poungouras
  Mimis Pierrakos
  Sotiris-Pantelis Pispas
  Minas Pitsos
  Manolis Roubakis
  Spyros Risvanis
  Dimitris Salpingidis
  Miltiadis Sapanis
  Achilleas Sarakatsanos
  Dimitris Saravakos
  Giannis Sardelis
  Nikos Sarganis
  Giourkas Seitaridis
  Dimitris Serpezis
  Antonis Siatounis
  Giorgos Sideras
  Georgios Sikalias
  Georgios Simos
  Stefanos Siontis
  Giannis Sourdis
  Frangiskos Sourpis
  Nikos Spyropoulos
  Panagiotis Spyropoulos
  Paschalis Staikos
  Giannis Stamatakis
  Yiannis Tomaras
  Stathis Tavlaridis
  Christos Terzanidis
  Vangelis Theocharis
  Ioannis Thomaidis
  Giorgos Theodoridis
  Georgios Tourkochoritis
  Alexandros Triantafyllopoulos
  Konstantinos Triantafyllopoulos
  Theodoros Tripotseris
  Alexandros Tsemperidis
  Thanasis Tsigas
  Theodoros Tsirigotis
  Fanis Tzandaris
  Marios Tzavidas
  Spyros Tzavidas
  Alexandros Tziolis
  Alexandros Tzorvas
  Giorgos Vagiannidis
  Georgios Vakouftsis
  Nikos Vamvakoulas
  Christos Vasiliou
  Markos Vellidis
  Nikos Vergos
  Vangelis Vlachos
  Leonidas Vokolos
  Christos Voutsas
  Vasilis Xenopoulos
  Christos Yfantidis
  Vasilis Zagaritis
  Giannis Zaradoukas
Hungary
  Márton Esterházy
  Josef Fitos
  Sándor Torghelle
  Gergely Rudolf
  Dominik Nagy
  László Kleinheisler
Iceland
  Helgi Sigurðsson
  Hörður Björgvin Magnússon
Israel
  Nir Mansour
  Omri Altman
Italy
 Lampros Choutos
 Alessandro Beni
 Giandomenico Mesto
 Cristian Daniel Ledesma
 Federico Macheda
 Christian Konan
 Alberto Brignoli
 Matteo Colombo
Ivory Coast
 Ibrahim Sissoko
Japan
  Yōhei Kajiyama
Kenya
 Mohamed Catana Nianz
Lithuania
  Raimondas Žutautas
Mali
   Cédric Kanté
   Ousmane Coulibaly
   Yacouba Sylla
Morocco
 Ouasim Bouy
 Anuar Tuhami
 Yassin Ayoub
Mozambique
 Simão Mate Junior

Netherlands
 Boudewijn de Geer
 Grigoris Tsinos
 Tschen La Ling
 Nordin Wooter
 Kostas Lamprou
 Pantelis Hatzidiakos
 Nicky Kuiper
 David Mendes da Silva
 Mark Sifneos
 Bart Schenkeveld
 David Panka
New Zealand
  Valentinos Vlachos
  Kosta Barbarouses
Nigeria
  Emmanuel Olisadebe
  Joseph Enakarhire
  Abdul Jeleel Ajagun
  Timipere Johnson Eboh
Norway
  Arne Dokken
  Erik Mykland
  Frank Strandli
  Ghayas Zahid
Paraguay
  Severiano Irala
  Marcelo Casas
Peru
  Percy Olivares
  Juan José Oré
Poland
  Giannis Vonortas
  Krzysztof Warzycha
  Józef Wandzik
  Igor Sypniewski
  Maciej Bykowski
  Jakub Wawrzyniak
  Arkadiusz Malarz
  Marcin Juszczak
  Rafał Zawisłan
  Michał Koj
  Ksawier Popiela
  Tymoteusz Puchacz
Portugal
  Paulo Sousa
  Carlos Chainho
  Hélder Postiga
  Daniel Fernandes
  Zeca
  André Almeida Pinto
  Nuno Reis
  João Nunes
  António Xavier
  Miguel Tavares
  Paulo Agostinho
Romania
  Theodoros Tsili
  Constantin Deleanu 
  Dan Georgiadis
  Dănuţ Lupu
  Doru Nicolae
  Erik Lincar
  Dumitru Mitu
  Lucian Sânmărtean
  Cristian Ganea
Russia
  Moris Nusuev
  Yuri Lodygin
Senegal
  Dame N'Doye
  Pape Habib Sow
  Younousse Sankharé
  Cheikh Niasse
Serbia
  Borivoje Đorđević
  Nikola Budišić
  Vladan Milojević
  Mateo Radovanović
  Alexios Touroukis
  Markos Touroukis
  Mijat Gaćinović
Slovenia
  Adam Gnezda Čerin
  Andraž Šporar
  Benjamin Verbič
South Africa
  Angelos Messaris
  Nasief Morris
  Bryce Moon
Spain
  Víctor Sánchez
  Josu Sarriegi
  Luis García
  Toché
  Vitolo
  Jokin Esparza 
  Nano
  Sergio Sánchez
  Fausto
  Carlitos
  Fran Vélez
  Aitor Cantalapiedra
  Juankar
  Antoñito
  Rubén Pérez
Sweden
  Njogu Demba-Nyrén
  Mikael Nilsson
  Mikael Antonsson 
  Mattias Bjärsmyr 
  Emir Bajrami
  Marcus Berg
  Valmir Berisha
  Niklas Hult
  Guillermo Molins
  Mattias Johansson
  Oscar Hiljemark
  Ramon Pascal Lundqvist
  Alexander Jeremejeff
Syria
  Abdul Rahman Weiss
Turkey
  Michalis Papazoglou
  Nikos Kovis
  Lysandros Dikaiopoulos
  Ulysses Kokkinos
United States
  Alex Tabakis 
  Cyrus Margono
Uruguay
  Carlos Linaris
  Bruno Fornaroli
  Adrián Balboa 
Uzbekistan
  Jafar Irismetov
  Dimitris Papadopoulos
Venezuela
  José Manuel Velázquez

 
Association football player non-biographical articles
Panathinaikos